Tulia Independent School District is a public school district based in Tulia, Texas (USA).

In 2009, the school district was rated "academically acceptable" by the Texas Education Agency.

Schools
Tulia High School (Grades 9-12)
Tulia Junior High School (Grades 6-8)
W.V. Swinburn Elementary School (Grades 3-5)
Highland Elementary School (Grades PK-2)

References

External links
Tulia ISD

School districts in Swisher County, Texas